Ian James "Bluey" Hampshire (9 May 1948 – 2 September 2018) was an Australian rules footballer who played for Geelong and Footscray.  He played as a ruckman.

Recruited from Portland to Geelong, Hampshire made his VFL debut in 1968 and played with the club for eight seasons. He moved to Footscray in 1976 where he acted as a secondary ruckman to Gary Dempsey. Dempsey left the club three seasons later and Hampshire became Footscray's first choice in the ruck, finishing second in the club's best and fairest. In 1981 he was selected to represent Victoria.

In round 20, 1981, against Fitzroy (Hampshire's 100th game for Footscray and 13 weeks after his 200th career game) he became the first VFL/AFL player to play 100 games at two clubs.

Hampshire represented Victoria on one occasion, against Tasmania at North Hobart Oval on 4th July 1981 (Vic 31.20.206 def Tas 16.12.108).

During the 1982 VFL season, Footscray coach Royce Hart left the club and Hampshire was given the role of coach. He retired as a player and coached the club until the end of the following season when they finished 7th. He maintained his plumbing business in Geelong while playing and coaching at Footscray.

He and his wife Jan had a son and a daughter. He suffered severe strokes in 2006 and 2014 that affected his mobility.

References

External links

Ian Hampshire's coaching record at AFL Tables

1948 births
2018 deaths
Australian rules footballers from Victoria (Australia)
Geelong Football Club players
Western Bulldogs players
Western Bulldogs coaches
Portland Football Club players